Sello (Finnish for cello) is a shopping mall in the Leppävaara, Espoo, Finland. The mall contains more than 170 shops and services including a concert hall and a library. The largest stores in the shopping center are Prisma, K-Citymarket, Power, Tokmanni, Halonen, H&M, and Intersport Megastore. 

The Sello is separated into three parts: the oldest part (finished in 2002), the second part (finished in 2005) and the newest part (finished in 2008). The oldest part of Sello has two hypermarkets, three banks, contains Espoo City's main library, a concert hall, gym, restaurants and cafes, pharmacy, an Alko and a music academy. The second part of Sello has many restaurants and smaller stores, and multiple sport stores such as Intersport and Stadium. Sello's third and newest part was designed to have a movie theater, several restaurants and a bowling alley. Sello also has a hotel named Hotel Sello, property of the Palace Kämp Group.

It is served by Leppävaara bus station and Leppävaara railway station immediately to the north, with Ring I running just to the east.

On 31 December 2009, five people were killed during a shooting spree in the mall.

See also
 Itis shopping centre, in East Helsinki

References

External links 

 

Shopping centres in Espoo
Leppävaara